Leonardo Incorvaia (born 26 June 1992 in Argentina) is an Argentinean footballer.

References

External links
 Audio Interview

1992 births
Living people
Argentine footballers
Argentine expatriate footballers
Association football defenders
Ferro Carril Oeste footballers
Sliema Wanderers F.C. players
UAI Urquiza players
A.C. Barnechea footballers
Primera B de Chile players
Expatriate footballers in Chile